The Almaty Marathon is an annual marathon hosted by Almaty, Kazakhstan. It is always held in April. The Almaty Marathon is the largest sporting event in Central Asia. Since 2013 it is a member of the AIMS international association. The Almaty Marathon tracks are certified according to the rules of AIMS and IAAF and have category “B”, but in connection with the difference in altitude at a distance that does not meet the requirements of the IAAF, world records are not registered.

As of 2018, the Almaty Marathon includes 6 events: (traditional) marathon (42 km 195 m) – participants from 18 years old and above; half marathon (21 km 97,5 m) - participants from 18 years old and above; Satellite race (10 km) - participants from 15 years old and above; Nordic walk (10 km) - participants from 15 years old and above; children's race (3 km) - participants from 10 up to 14 years old; corporate marathon relay (42 km 195 m) – teams of 6 persons from 16 years old and above.

In addition, a number of seasonal and thematic races are organized throughout the year, which are preparatory starts for the spring marathon.

Course
Till 2017 inclusive the Marathon course started at the Park of the First President and at the “Nurly Tau” business-center (children's distance), the race finished at the Central Stadium.

In 2018, the certification of the tracks was updated and the course was changed. The start and finish are located in one place – on Republic Square. During the Marathon several streets are closed. So, in 2018 the Marathon course ran through the whole city: along Nazarbayev Square (from Satpayev Street to Al-Farabi Square), south side of Al-Farabi, Sain Street (from Al-Farabi to Abay Square), Abay Square (from Sain to Baitursynov Street) and Satpayev (from Baitursynov Street to Nazarbayev Square).

Organizers 
The organizers of the competition are – “Courage to be First” Corporate Fund,  «World Class Almaty» Fitness-Club and Acаdemic Shakhmardan Yessenov Science and Education Foundation, which is also the founder of the Almaty Marathon.

The idea of holding the Marathon appeared in 2012, when the World Class Fitness-Club decided to celebrate the anniversary of its foundation. The idea of a charitable marathon was suggested by Galymzhan Yessenov and Aizhan Yessim. The Marathon is supported by the akimat of Almaty and various private organizations.

Purposes 
The organizer of the Almaty Marathon - Corporate Fund “Courage to be First” calls its main mission the promotion of an active lifestyle by engaging people in physical culture and sport, while doing it on professional level, in accordance with the high international standards. In the framework of corporate responsibility the Fund helps children with special needs to reach their potential by giving them the opportunity to lead an active life, develop physically, allocating the raised funds to the creation of the necessary sports infrastructure and to provide them with the necessary medical assistance.

All those wishing to participate (people over 10 years old) contribute an entry fee in the amount of 3 to 5 thousand KZT. The collected funds go, according to tradition, for charitable purposes.

History 
The Almaty Marathon is one of the first charitable marathons that allocate funds raised to help sick people.

2012 
The first such marathon, entitled “Charitable Marathon -Courage to be First” was held on May 27, 2012, about 2500 people took part in the marathon, rather than the initially registered 500. The fund raised at the Marathon went to the treatment of Yesbol Miras (2 years old), a patient with cerebral palsy and spastic diplegia.

2013 
The second Almaty Marathon was held on April 28, 2013, within the framework of which over 5,000 participants came to the start. The tradition of conducting the marathon on the last Sunday of April was approved. Funds collected at the marathon were allocated for the construction of mini-water areas in the Ardi rehabilitation center for the rehabilitation of children with cerebral palsy and organization of therapeutic swimming classes.

2014 
The third Almaty marathon took place on April 20, 2014. The number of marathon participants exceeded 10 thousand people; the collected funds were transferred to the voluntary company "Mercy", which collects funds for the treatment of children with oncology. Astana Motors, as the general partner of the marathon, also presented an ambulance for the oncology department of the Research Institute of Pediatrics and Children's Surgery in Almaty.

2015 
The fourth marathon was held on April 26, 2015, 19 thousand participants from more than 40 countries of the world took part in it. The Almaty Marathon organizers built a modern stadium for the boarding school No. 9 in Almaty, a specialized educational institution for children with severe speech impairments. 72 people became winners of the marathon (including 27 marathoners from 9 age categories).

2016 
The jubilee fifth marathon was held on April 24, 2016 with the participation, according to various sources, from 25 to 30 thousand people with 13,300 registered. The medals were awarded to the winners and medalists of the Marathon in different age categories, as well as to the winners and medalists of other distances. In total, 12, 5 million KZT was collected which was spent to buy four apparatus for restoration of the musculoskeletal system: support unloading compensator “Kovrit” and imitators of walking "Imitron"..

2017 
VI Almaty marathon started on April 23, 2017. Officially more than 13 thousand people were registered from 42 countries and the number of major disciplines was expanded to six. Funds from the starting fees were directed to treatment of more than 1500 children with serious diseases from 6 specialized institutions.

2018 
The seventh Almaty marathon was held on April 22, 2018 on the updated course. More than 14 thousand people came to the start. Funds collected from the participants' starting fees will be used to build sports grounds and purchase sports equipment in three specialized children's institutions: the first children's hospice for children with cancer "I'm with you", the regional special boarding school for children with visual impairments in the city of Yesik, special (correctional) boarding school No. 6 for children with intellectual disabilities. The completion of the facilities is planned in September 2018.

2019 
The 2019 event took place on April 21, 2019.

2020 
The 2020 edition of the race was cancelled due to the coronavirus pandemic, with all registrants being able to receive their starter kit, t-shirt, and finisher medal, and being able to apply for a refund of half of their entry fee.

Winners
Key:

Notes

References

External links 
 Ahotu - Almaty Marathon

Marathons in Kazakhstan
International sports competitions hosted by Kazakhstan
Recurring sporting events established in 2012
Sports competitions in Kazakhstan
Spring (season) events in Kazakhstan